Zuylestein Castle (Dutch Huis Zuylenstein; also spelt Zuylestein or Zuilenstein) is a castle near the town of Leersum in the Netherlands, some twenty miles east of the city of Utrecht.

The house itself dates to the fourteenth century, but only gained its municipal status in 1536. Originally the property of the burgomaster of Utrecht, the holding passed into the hands of  Frederick Henry, then Prince of Orange, in 1630. He ceded the castle and its lands to his illegitimate son, Frederick, together with the title Lord of Zuylestein (in Dutch: Heer van Zuylestein) in 1640. The castle survived the ravages of the European wars that followed, but was severely damaged in the Second World War. Today the house and gardens have been restored.

References

Castles in Utrecht (province)
Utrechtse Heuvelrug